David Borthwick may refer to:

 David Borthwick, Lord Lochill (died 1581), Scottish lawyer
 David Borthwick (shinty player) (born 1962), Scottish shinty player
 David Borthwick (cricketer) (born 1963), former English cricketer
 David Borthwick (public servant) (born 1950), former departmental secretary for the Australian Government environment department (between 2004 and 2009)